Kandi is one of the administrative blocks of Garhwa district, Jharkhand state, India.

About Danda Garhwa Jharkhand 
Kandi  a Taluka/Block, close to GARHWA, is located 44 km from Garhwa. Kandi is located near koel river and son river . It's well covered by Vodafone, Airtel, Reliance, BSNL, Aircel, Idea, Airtel 3G/4G, like cellular networks.

Languages
Languages spoken here include Asuri, an Austroasiatic language spoken by approximately 17 000 in India, largely in the southern part of Palamu; and Bhojpuri, a tongue in the Bihari language group with almost 40 000 000 speakers, written in both the Devanagari and Kaithi scripts.

Facilities
Market:   A small market called as Kandi  Bazaar is situated in the middle of the block. 
2 petrol pumps are also available:-

• Shree Raghunath Jee Fuels ( Bharat Petroleum ) : It's situated at the centre of the administrative block alongside the main road of Kandi and is the nearest petrol pump service to the Main Bazaar.

• Resham Laxmi Petroleum ( Indian Oil ) : This petrol pump has also a good service.

See also
 Districts of Jharkhand
 Palamu district
 Garhwa district
 Latehar district

References

Garhwa district
Community development blocks in Jharkhand
Community development blocks in Garhwa district
Cities and towns in Garhwa district